Kalleh Menar (also Romanized as Kalleh Menār) is a village in Qalandarabad Rural District, Qalandarabad District, Fariman County, Razavi Khorasan Province, Iran. At the 2006 census, its population was 45, in 15 families.

References 

Populated places in Fariman County